List of places in the U.S. state of Arizona.

The current cities, towns, unincorporated communities, counties, and other recognized places in the state. It also includes information on the number and names of counties in which a place lies, and its lower and upper ZIP code bounds when applicable.

Alphabetical links

See also
Category: Lists of places in Arizona
 List of cemeteries in Arizona
List of cities and towns in Arizona
List of counties in Arizona

References
USGS Fips55 database

 01